Marquese is a given name. Notable people with the name include:

Marquese Chriss (born 1997), American basketball player
Marquese Scott (born 1981), American dancer

See also
Marques (disambiguation), includes a list of people with given name Marques
Marquis (name), given name and surname